Lucien Bourassa was a local politician in Shawinigan, Quebec.  He was the city's ninth mayor, serving from 1936 until his death the following year.

He was born in 1884 in Saint-Barnabé, Mauricie.

Bourassa served as a council member from 1922 to 1926, 1928 to 1930 and 1932 to 1934.

He ran for mayor in 1936 and won, but died in office in 1937.  He was succeeded by Alexandre Gélinas.

Avenue Lucien-Bourassa in the Shawinigan-Nord neighbourhood was named to honour him.

Footnotes

See also
Mayors of Shawinigan
Mauricie
Shawinigan, Quebec

1884 births
1937 deaths
Mayors of Shawinigan